Sophia Olelkovich Radziwill (Lit. Sofija Olelkaitė-Radvilienė, Saint Sophia of Slutsk, Princess Sophia of Slutsk; 1 May 1585 – 19 March 1612) was a Lithuanian Orthodox Christian saint. She was the last descendant of the family Olelkovich-Slutsk (princes of Slutsk and Kopyl) who were descended from Prince Algirdas. She was canonized by the Orthodox Church in 1983. The church of St. Sophia of Slutsk in Minsk is named after her.

Early life
Sophia was born on 1 May 1585.  Her mother died the same year, and her father Prince Yury Semenovich died on 6 May 1586.  Sophia was raised by distant relatives, first by the governor of Samogitia province Yury Chodkiewicz (of the Chodkiewicz family) who took her to Vilnius, and then by the governor of Brest province, Hieronymus Chodkiewicz.

Wedding
Because of debts the Chodkiewiczes owed to the Radziwill family, it became expedient to make a match between Sophia and Janusz Radziwill, Prince of Nesvizh and a son of the governor of Vilnius, Prince Krzysztof Radziwill.  At this time Sophia was eleven years old. The wedding between Sophia and Janusz was scheduled for 6 February 1600 in Vilnius. Before this happened there was a falling out between the Chodkiewiczes and the Radziwills, almost certainly over the financial arrangements that the wedding was contingent upon. The matter proceeded to a court but the decision was in favor of the Radziwills, possibly because the judge rendering the verdict was Jerzy Radziwill.

Rather than accept the verdict the Chodkiewiczes retreated with Sophia to their castle in Vilnius. Janusz Radziwill’s father Krzysztof collected 6,000 troops in Vilnius and prepared for battle against the Chodkiewiczes with their 2,500 troops.
The tense situation was only calmed when four senators sent by the Polish King Sigismund III Vasa arrived and began to resolve the conflict through negotiations.  A compromise was hammered out whereby the property claims of the Radziwills against the Chodkiewiczes were nullified and the latter were indemnified for their handling of the assets of Princess Sophia.

Orthodox faith
Janusz Radziwill petitioned Pope Clement VIII for permission to marry Sophia on 20 July 1600. Because Sophia was adamant in her decision to remain Orthodox and raise any children in the Orthodox faith this led to a written discussion on the subject of interdenominational marriage between the Pope and the Patriarch of Constantinople. The Union of Brest of 1596 realigning the Belarusian Church and the Ukrainian Church from the Patriarchate of Constantinople to the Holy See in Rome caused enormous grief for Sophia as she did not wish to convert to Catholicism, which was being practiced by most of the Polish and Lithuanian nobility (although apparently not by her husband-to-be Janusz, who was Calvinist).

The marriage between Sophia and Janusz took place in one of the cathedrals of Brest-Litovsk (now Brest) in accordance with the Orthodox rites on 1 October 1600.  Due to the strength of Sophia’s passion about her Orthodox beliefs, she was instrumental in the promulgation of measures allowing the inhabitants of her ancestral lands (in present-day Belarus) to choose to stay Orthodox rather than converting to Catholicism. Other measures were enacted forbidding Eastern Catholic priests from replacing Orthodox priests when the latter died. Sophia was generous in her donations to churches, monasteries, and the clergy.  In part due to her efforts, Slutsk became a bastion of Orthodoxy and a religious center.

Sophia died in childbirth at Myleniec (Omelevo), near the town of Chervyen on 19 March 1612 at the age of 26. Originally buried in the castle church of the Holy Trinity in Slutsk, her relics are currently in the Holy Spirit Cathedral in Minsk.

Her feast day is 19 March on the Church calendar.

References

1585 births
1612 deaths
People from Slutsk
People from Nowogródek Voivodeship (1507–1795)
Sophia Olelkovich Radziwill
Eastern Orthodox saints from Belarus
Belarusian saints
Deaths in childbirth
17th-century Lithuanian people
16th-century Lithuanian people
17th-century Lithuanian women
16th-century Lithuanian women
17th-century Christian saints